The 1961 Chicago Cubs season was the 90th season of the Chicago Cubs franchise, the 86th in the National League and the 46th at Wrigley Field. In the first season under their College of Coaches, the Cubs finished seventh in the National League with a record of 64–90, 29 games behind the Cincinnati Reds.

Offseason
 January 12, 1961: Billy Cowan was signed as an amateur free agent by the Cubs.

Regular season

The College of Coaches 
This season marked the introduction of the so-called "College of Coaches", a system instituted by owner Philip K. Wrigley after input from El Tappe. Under this system, the Cubs would have no single manager, but instead would have a rotating series of eight coaches, with one managing the team while others served as either assistant coaches or minor league field personnel.

Four different men served as manager during 1961: Tappe, who served the most games in the position and had a record of 42–54; Harry Craft, who had a record of 7–9; Vedie Himsl, who had a record of 10–21; and Lou Klein, who was brought on board in midseason and had a record of 5–6. Other coaches in the system during the season were Charlie Grimm – the team's manager in 1960 – Bobby Adams, Dick Cole, Ripper Collins, Goldie Holt, Fred Martin and Verlon Walker. The team improved to 64–90, four games better than their 1960 record, although none of the four managers posted a winning record individually. The experiment would be carried over into the 1962 season.

Season standings

Record vs. opponents

Notable transactions 
 April 1, 1961: Lou Johnson was traded by the Cubs to the Los Angeles Angels for Jim McAnany.
 May 9, 1961: Frank Thomas was traded by the Cubs to the Milwaukee Braves for Mel Roach.
 July 20, 1961: Curt Motton was signed as an amateur free agent by the Cubs.
 September 21, 1961: Paul Casanova was signed as a free agent the Cubs.

Roster

Player stats

Batting

Starters by position 
Note: Pos = Position; G = Games played; AB = At bats; H = Hits; Avg. = Batting average; HR = Home runs; RBI = Runs batted in

Other batters 
Note: G = Games played; AB = At bats; H = Hits; Avg. = Batting average; HR = Home runs; RBI = Runs batted in

Pitching

Starting pitchers 
Note: G = Games pitched; IP = Innings pitched; W = Wins; L = Losses; ERA = Earned run average; SO = Strikeouts

Other pitchers 
Note: G = Games pitched; IP = Innings pitched; W = Wins; L = Losses; ERA = Earned run average; SO = Strikeouts

Relief pitchers 
Note: G = Games pitched; W = Wins; L = Losses; SV = Saves; ERA = Earned run average; SO = Strikeouts

Farm system 

LEAGUE CHAMPIONS: San Antonio

Notes

References 

1961 Chicago Cubs season at Baseball Reference

Chicago Cubs seasons
Chicago Cubs season
Chicago Cubs